Just An American Boy is a live album by Steve Earle. The album was released in 2003.

Track listing
All songs written by Steve Earle unless otherwise noted.
"Audience Intro" - 0:28
"Amerika V. 6.0 (The Best We Can Do)" - 4:37
"Ashes to Ashes" - 4:08
"Paranoia [Monologue]" - 1:28
"Conspiracy Theory" - 4:23
"I Remember You" - 3:10
"Schertz, Texas [Monologue]" - 2:51
"Hometown Blues" - 3:52
"The Mountain" - 5:38
"Pennsylvania Miners [Monologue]" - 1:08
"Harlan Man" - 3:29
"Copperhead Road" - 6:28
"Guitar Town" - 2:42
"I Oppose the Death Penalty [Monologue]" - 0:46
"Over Yonder (Jonathan's Song)" - 4:19
"Billy Austin" - 6:54
"Audience Intro" - 0:24
"South Nashville Blues" - 3:00
"Rex's Blues/Ft. Worth Blues" - 6:56 (Townes Van Zandt)
"John Walker's Blues" - 3:29
"Jerusalem" - 4:07
"The Unrepentant" - 6:55
"Christmas in Washington" - 10:32
"Democracy [Monologue]" - 1:51
"(What's So Funny 'Bout) Peace, Love, and Understanding" - 3:39 (Nick Lowe)
"Time You Waste" - 3:41 (Justin Earle)

Personnel
Steve Earle -  guitar, mandolin, harmonica, vocals, rhetoric
Eric “Roscoe” Ambel -  guitar, vocals
Kelley Looney -  bass guitar, vocals
Will Rigby -  drums, percussion, vocals
Patrick Earle -  percussion
Garrison Starr -  vocals on "I Remember You" and "Conspiracy Theory"
Justin Townes Earle - guitars and keyboards 
The Bluegrass Dukes are:
Tim O'Brien - mandolin and vocals
Darrell Scott - banjo and vocals
Dennis Crouch - dog house bass
Casey Driessen - fiddle

Chart performance

References

Steve Earle live albums
2003 live albums
Artemis Records live albums